Gilberto is the Iberian and Italian version of the originally Norman-French given name Gilbert, used in Italian, Portuguese and Spanish languages. In Galician, it's spelled Xilberto or Xilberte. Gilbert is ultimately derived from the Germanic words gisel (meaning pledge or hostage) and beraht (meaning bright).  It can be used as a given name or surname.

Gilberto may refer to:

Given name

Footballers
 Gilberto Galdino dos Santos (born 1976), Brazilian football player, commonly known as Beto
 Gilberto Alves (born 1950), Brazilian footballer, commonly known as Gil
 Gilberto Ribeiro Gonçalves (born 1980), Brazilian international footballer, commonly known as Gil
 Gilberto da Silva Melo (born 1976), Brazilian footballer, commonly known as Gilberto
 Gilberto Oliveira Souza Junior (born 1989), Brazilian football player, commonly known as Gilberto
 Felisberto Sebastião da Graça Amaral (born 1982), Angolan footballer, commonly known as Gilberto
 Gilberto Moraes Júnior, (born 1993) Brazilian footballer, commonly known as Gilberto
 Gilberto Gomes (born 1959), retired Portuguese footballer, commonly known as Gilberto
 Gilberto dos Santos (born 1975), Lebanese footballer
 Gilberto Aparecido da Silva (born 1976), Brazilian footballer, commonly known as Gilberto Silva
 Gilberto Manuel Pereira da Silva (born 1987), Portuguese footballer, commonly known as Gilberto Silva
 Gilberto Fortunato, Brazilian footballer
 Gilberto Sepúlveda, Mexican footballer

Other athletes
 Gilberto González (triathlete) (born 1970), Venezuelan triathlete
 Gilberto Parlotti (1940–1971), Italian motorcycle racer
 Gilberto Passani (born 1961), Italian volleyball player
 Gilberto Simoni (born 1971), Italian road bicycle racer
 Gilberto Sosa (born 1960), Mexican boxer

Other
 Gilberto Câmara  (born 1956), Brazilian computer scientist
 Gilberto Duavit Sr. (1934–2018), Filipino politician and businessman
 Gilberto Duavit Jr. (born 1963), Filipino businessman
 Gilberto Gil (born 1942), Brazilian musician and former Minister of Culture
 Gilberto Rodríguez Orejuela (born 1939), cofounder of the Cali cartel

Surname

 Astrud Gilberto (born 1940), Brazilian singer
 Bebel Gilberto (born 1966), Brazilian singer, daughter of João Gilberto and Miúcha
 João Gilberto (1931–2019), Brazilian guitarist and singer

References

Italian masculine given names
Portuguese masculine given names
Spanish masculine given names
Masculine given names